Babusha (died 1330) was a Naiman empress consort of the Yuan dynasty, married to the Khutughtu Khan (Emperor Mingzong).

She was born to Princess Shouning, who was the niece of Chengzong. She married Khutughtu Khan before he became emperor.
She approved of the famous cook book of Huou, Yin-shanZhengyao (1330). 

After the death of her spouse, the execution of Babusha, in parallel with the exile of Toghon Temur to Korea in May 1330, were both ordered by Budashiri to secure the succession of Aratnadara. She was executed after having accused Budashiri of the coup against her late husband.

Notes

 George Qingzhi Zhao, Marriage as Political Strategy and Cultural Expression: Mongolian Royal ...
 Denis C. Twitchett, Herbert Franke, John King Fairbank, The Cambridge History of China: Volume 6, Alien Regimes and Border States ...
 Mary Ellen Snodgrass, World Food: An Encyclopedia of History, Culture and Social Influence from ...

Year of birth missing
1330 deaths
14th-century Mongolian women
Yuan dynasty empresses
14th-century Chinese women
14th-century Chinese people